Otitoma rubiginosa is a species of sea snail, a marine gastropod mollusk in the family Pseudomelatomidae, the turrids and allies.

Description
The length of the shell attains 7.5 mm.

The reddish brown shell contains six whorls, somewhat rounded, with revolving striae.

Distribution
This marine species occurs in the Strait of Malacca

References

 Hinds, R. B. "On new species of Pleurotoma, Clavatula, and Mangelia." Proceedings of the Zoological society of London. Vol. 11. 1843.
 Wiedrick S.G. (2014). Review of the genera Otitoma Jousseaume, 1880 and Thelecytharella with the description of two new species Gastropoda: Conoidea: Pseudomelatomidae) from the southwest Pacific Ocean. The Festivus. 46(3): 40-53

External links
  Tucker, J.K. 2004 Catalog of recent and fossil turrids (Mollusca: Gastropoda). Zootaxa 682:1-1295
 Kilburn R.N. (2004) The identities of Otitoma and Antimitra (Mollusca: Gastropoda: Conidae and Buccinidae). African Invertebrates, 45: 263-270
 Gastropods.com: Otitoma rubiginosa

rubiginosa
Gastropods described in 1843